Kosmos 2524 is a Russian reconnaissance satellite part of its ELINT Liana program. Developed and built by TsSKB Progress and KB Arsenal, it was launched on December 2, 2017. It is based on the Yantar satellite's bus.

Launch 
Despite the launch failure of another Soyuz 2-1B rocket just four days before, Kosmos 2524 launched on December 2, 2017, from Plesetsk Cosmodrome Site 43 at 10:43 UTC.

References 

2017 in spaceflight
Spacecraft launched in 2017
Satellites of Russia
Reconnaissance satellites
Satellites in low Earth orbit